William Pilczuk (born September 14, 1971) is an American former competition swimmer and world champion.  Pilczuk specialized in the 50-meter freestyle, winning medals in the event in the FINA world championships, Pan Pacific Championships, and Pan American Games.

Pilczuk is a native of Cape May Point, New Jersey.  He graduated from Lower Cape May Regional High School, as a three-time All-Cape-Atlantic League swimmer, and swam for the Wildwood Crest Dolphins club swimming program.

Pilczuk was a walk-on at Miami-Dade Community College, where he earned a scholarship his second year.  After graduating with an AA, he transferred to Auburn University on a "books" athletic scholarship in Auburn, Alabama, where he competed for the Auburn Tigers swimming and diving team from 1991 to 1994.  During his college career, he earned Academic All-American honors two consecutive years and three NCAA all-American awards.  He graduated from Auburn with his bachelor's degree, magna cum laude, in 1994, a master's degree in exercise physiology in 1998, and completed the course work for a master's in Sociology.

Pilczuk won a silver medal in the 50-meter freestyle at the 1995 Pan American Games, gold at the 1997 Pan Pacific Championships and bronze at the 1999 Pan Pacific Championships.  He won the world title in his signature 50-meter freestyle event at the 1998 World Championships, with a time of 22.29 seconds.  In the process, he defeated Russia's Alexander Popov in what USA Today called the "Upset of the Decade."  He was also a five-time U.S. national champion, and was a member of the 4x50-meter medley relay world record team in 1996.  Pilczuk also set the American Record in the 50m freestyle (scm) in 1999 on the lead off of a relay.

He served as an assistant coach for the Tigers swim team from 1997 to 2003, during which the Auburn men's team won their first-ever NCAA team championship in 1997, and the men's and women's teams won additional NCAA team championships in 2003.  Pilczuk was the National Sprint coach and National Youth coach for Great Britain from 2003 to 2008, and was a coach on several international teams including the World Championships, Junior World Championships, European Championships, European Juniors, Australian Age-Group Championships, and the FINA World Cups.  From 2008 to 2013, Pilczuk worked with individual swimmers, club teams, camps and clinics, including several 2012 Olympic team members.  Since August 2013, he been a coach at the Savannah College of Art and Design, where he is now the head coach.  The SCAD Bees won their first NAIA Championship in 6 years in 2016, earning Pilczuk the NAIA Women's Coach of the Year honors.

He now resides in Pooler, Georgia, with his wife Davana and their two children.

References

External links
 

1971 births
Living people
American male freestyle swimmers
Auburn Tigers men's swimmers
People from Cape May Point, New Jersey
Sportspeople from Cape May County, New Jersey
Swimmers at the 1995 Pan American Games
World Aquatics Championships medalists in swimming
Pan American Games silver medalists for the United States
Pan American Games medalists in swimming
Universiade medalists in swimming
Universiade silver medalists for the United States
Medalists at the 1995 Summer Universiade
Medalists at the 1995 Pan American Games